Toho Titanium Soccer Club is a Japanese football club based in Kanagawa. The club has played in Japan Soccer League Division 2. It currently plays in the Kantō Soccer League, one of the nine leagues that makes part of the Japanese Regional Leagues, which corresponds as the 5th tier of Japanese football.

Squad
Updated to September 24th, 2022.

External links
Official site
Football of Japan

 
Football clubs in Japan
Japan Soccer League clubs
1955 establishments in Japan
Japan Football League (1992–1998) clubs
Sports teams in Kanagawa Prefecture
Association football clubs established in 1955
Works association football clubs in Japan